Onyeka Lucky Osemene (born 18 June 1995) is a Nigerian football player who plays for CF Canelas 2010.

Club career
He made his professional debut in the Segunda Liga for Braga B on 8 August 2015 in a game against Chaves.

References

External links
 

1995 births
Living people
Nigerian footballers
S.C. Salgueiros players
Nigerian expatriate footballers
Expatriate footballers in Portugal
G.D. Ribeirão players
S.C. Braga B players
Liga Portugal 2 players
C.D. Trofense players
S.C. Covilhã players
U.D. Leiria players
Nigerian expatriate sportspeople in Portugal
Association football forwards